Phonology: Theory and Analysis is a 1975 book by Larry Hyman designed for an introductory course in phonology.

Reception
The book was reviewed by Alan H. Sommerstein, Dale E. Woolley and Irwin Howard.

References 

1975 non-fiction books
Phonology books
Linguistics textbooks